Hiratsuka (written: 平塚 or 平墳) is a Japanese surname. Notable people with the surname include:

, Japanese footballer
, Japanese footballer
, Japanese writer, journalist and activist
, Japanese golfer
, Japanese printmaker
, Japanese footballer

Japanese-language surnames